"A Royal Flush" is the fifth Christmas special episode of the BBC sitcom, Only Fools and Horses, first screened on 25 December 1986. It was re-edited into a shorter version with added laughter track and released on DVD in 2004. In the episode, Rodney becomes friends with the daughter of a Duke, and Del decides to help him make the right impression.

Synopsis
As Del Boy sells cutlery to the local market crowd, Rodney encounters a pretty young woman, and abandons his lookout position to talk to her. At Sid's café, she introduces herself as Vicky. As the conversation develops, Rodney discovers that she is Lady Victoria Marsham-Hales, of Covington House, Berkshire, the daughter of the Duke of Maylebury, who is a second cousin of the Queen. She also explains that her mother died in a skiing accident. Sensing a chance to make the Trotter family millionaires, Del decides to assist Rodney's blossoming friendship with Lady Victoria, such as by acquiring tickets for the opera Carmen.

On the night of the opera, Rodney and Victoria arrive, only to see that Del has also attended, along with June Snell (last seen in "Happy Returns"), an ex-girlfriend of Del and mother of one of Rodney's old girlfriends. Del and June ruin the night by obnoxiously eating snacks, talking during the performance, and arguing with other members of the audience. Nonetheless, Victoria invites Rodney to stay at Covington House for the weekend. Wanting Rodney to make a good impression, Del insists that he dress as a country gentleman in a tweed suit. Already uncomfortable during the weekend in Berkshire, Rodney is aghast when Del arrives with a confused Albert in the van, claiming to have turned up to deliver Rodney's evening suit that he "forgot" (although Rodney knows that he packed it and Del removed it so he had an excuse to turn up). As Rodney tries to calm himself, Del introduces himself to Victoria's father Henry and invites himself to that evening's dinner having coincidentally brought his own evening suit. Del takes part in their clay pigeon shoot using a pump-action shotgun borrowed from bank robber Iggy Higgins, and quickly begins to anger Henry.

At dinner, Del gets drunk and starts offending the guests with risqué jokes, implying a wedding between Rodney and Victoria is to be held, constantly talking about Leonardo da Vinci and humiliating Rodney by revealing his conviction for possession of cannabis. Del finally angers Henry enough by telling a skiing joke, despite knowing Victoria's mother died in a skiing accident. In a fit of rage, Henry demands Del meet him outside. As the two leave, Victoria asks Rodney if he is still staying overnight. Rodney reluctantly declines and decides to leave, both understanding that they should not see each other again. Outside, Henry orders that Del, Rodney and Albert are to leave his house immediately. Del tells Henry that Rodney may need to be paid off to leave Victoria alone.

Back at the flat, a fuming Rodney rants to a hungover Del how he has always ruined his opportunities to make a success of his life by getting involved, and injures his hand by punching a vent cover out of annoyance. After Rodney reveals that he refused the offer of a £1,000 payoff from Henry to stop seeing Vicky (infuriating Del, who had arranged the offer), Del says that had Rodney refused to stop seeing Victoria, he would probably have been assassinated by the Special Branch because of his conviction for drug use. Del half-heartedly apologises to Rodney and asks him to shake his hand, but this turns out to be a ploy for Del to inflict pain on Rodney for refusing the £1,000 by squeezing his injured hand.

Episode cast

Production

Writing 
This episode was inspired by two things. One was how the younger nobility were becoming closer, apparently, to the working class and the second was stories in the newspapers about Special Branch being employed to protect the younger royals from possible kidnap. Sullivan put these two things together when writing the episode and created the storyline of how Del would protect Rodney and at the same time "make a few bob on it". "Although Del comes across as rather cruel in the episode, his heart is in the right place".

Filming 
Filming for the episode began in November 1986 in Salisbury. Scenes set at the Theatre Royal, Drury Lane were all filmed there, except for the auditorium scenes and the performance of Carmen, which were instead filmed at the Buxton Opera House. Filming was delayed on two occasions, due to the separate illnesses of David Jason and Nicholas Lyndhurst. While the dinner scene towards the end of the episode was being filmed, writer John Sullivan was in Paris filming Just Good Friends. Sullivan said he later regretted this, and was unhappy with the scene. Producer Ray Butt agreed and took responsibility for the scene, stating that he thought "David [Jason] went a bit over the top", and that "Del turned too nasty and lost his warmth." Later, Jason also conceded that "perhaps that scene wasn't as good as it could have been."

Intended to be recorded in front of a live studio audience, time constraints meant that this was not possible, and thus the original version of the episode does not include a laughter track.

Editing 
Ray Butt and Tony Dow completed editing the episode on Christmas morning of 1986, the day it was due to be broadcast. There had been concern that the episode would not be completed on time, and a contingency plan was created which would have seen the final scene in the flat broadcast live.

The original version of the episode was released for VHS in 1998. In 2005, when the episode was due to be released on DVD, John Sullivan personally oversaw a re-edit of the episode. Eighteen minutes of footage was removed, and the episode was screened for members of the Only Fools and Horses Appreciation Society, with their reaction recorded and serving as a new laughter track. Dubbed the "writer's cut", this version of the episode became the main version supplied in subsequent home video releases, and on television repeats. In 2021, both versions of the episode were remastered in high definition and released together on Blu-ray.

Music
The Smiths: "Ask"
Erasure: "Sometimes
 Kent Opera: Handel's Overture for the Royal Fireworks
 Kent Opera: Extracts from Bizet's Carmen

References

External links

1986 British television episodes
Berkshire in fiction
British Christmas television episodes
Only Fools and Horses special episodes